Urban Beaches is the debut album by Cactus World News, released in 1986 on MCA Records.

The album peaked at No. 56 on the UK Albums Chart and No. 180 on the US Billboard 200.

Track listing

Personnel
Cactus World News
Eoin McEvoy - guitar, lead vocals
Fergal MacAindris - bass
Wayne Sheehy - drums, percussion
Frank Kearns - guitar

Additional musicians
Joan Whyte - backing vocals (5)
Niamh Whyte - backing vocals (5)

Production
Producer: Chris Kimsey
Engineer: Mary Kettle, Mark Freegard, Thomas Stiehler
Art direction and illustration: Brian Griffin, Conor Horgan

Charts
Album

Singles

References

External links

1986 debut albums
MCA Records albums
New wave albums by Irish artists